Zhang Xiaobin may refer to:
Zhang Xiaobin (footballer, born 1985) (张晓彬), Chinese footballer who plays for Beijing Guoan F.C.
Zhang Xiaobin (footballer, born 1993) (张晓彬), Chinese footballer who plays for Jiangsu Sainty F.C.